Reginald Arthur Smith wrote Towards A Living Encyclopedia, which offered suggestions for ways to bear out H.G. Wells's proposal for a "world brain".

See also
Global brain
Encyclopedism

References

Year of birth missing
Year of death missing
British encyclopedists
British non-fiction writers
British male writers
Male non-fiction writers